Eugenia Enriqueta Kalnay (born 1 October 1942) is an Argentine meteorologist and a Distinguished University Professor of Atmospheric and Oceanic Science, which is part of the University of Maryland College of Computer, Mathematical, and Natural Sciences at the University of Maryland, College Park in the United States.

In 1996, Kalnay was elected a member of the National Academy of Engineering for advances in understanding atmospheric dynamics, numerical modeling, atmospheric predictability, and the quality of U.S. operational weather forecasts.

She is the recipient of the 54th International Meteorological Organization Prize in 2009 from the World Meteorological Organization for her work on numerical weather prediction, data assimilation, and ensemble forecasting. As Director of the Environmental Modeling Center of the National Centers for Environmental Prediction (NCEP), Kalnay published the 1996 NCEP reanalysis paper entitled "The NCEP/NCAR 40-year reanalysis project", which is one of the most cited papers in the geosciences. She is listed as the author or co-author on over 120 scientific papers and wrote the book Atmospheric Modeling, Data Assimilation and Predictability, which was published by Cambridge University Press in 2003.

Life
Kalnay was born in Argentina and received her undergraduate degree in meteorology from the University of Buenos Aires in 1965. In 1971, Kalnay became the first woman to receive a PhD in meteorology from MIT, where she was advised by Jule Charney. She then became the first female professor in the MIT Department of Meteorology. In 1979 she moved to NASA Goddard and in 1984 became Head of the Global Modeling and Simulation Branch at the Goddard Laboratory for Atmospheres. From 1987 to 1997, Kalnay was the Director of the Environmental Modeling Center (EMC) of the National Centers for Environmental Prediction (NCEP), National Weather Service (NWS) and oversaw the NCEP/NCAR reanalysis project and numerous other projects in data assimilation and ensemble forecasting. After leaving NCEP, Kalnay became the Robert E. Lowry Chair of the School of Meteorology at the University of Oklahoma. In 2002, Kalnay joined the Department of Atmospheric and Oceanic Science at the University of Maryland, College Park and served as department chair.

Along with James A. Yorke, she co-founded the Weather/Chaos Group at the University of Maryland, which has made discoveries of the local, low-dimensionality of unstable atmospheric regions and the development of the Local Ensemble Kalman filter and Local Ensemble Transform Kalman Filter data assimilation methods. In addition to the Atmospheric and Ocean Department (AOSC), Kalnay has appointments in the Institute for Physical Science and Technology (IPST) and the Center for Computational Science and Mathematical Modeling (CSCAMM), also at the University of Maryland, College Park. In 2008, she was selected as the first Eugenia Brin Endowed Professorship in Data Assimilation.

Among the scientific methods, Kalnay has pioneered the breeding method, introduced, along with Zoltan Toth, as a method to identify the growing perturbations in a dynamical system. She was also a co-author on papers introducing the ensemble methods of Lag Averaged Forecasting (LAF) and Scaled LAF (with Ross N. Hoffman and Wesley Ebisuzaki).

In 2017, Kalnay was part of an international team of distinguished scientists who published a study on climate change models in the National Science Review journal. The study argues that crucial components are missing from current climate models that inform about environmental, climatic, and economic policies. Kalnay observed that without including real feedback, predictions for coupled systems could not work, and the model can get away from reality very quickly.

Positions
Kalnay is a fellow of the American Geophysical Union, the American Meteorological Society, the American Association for the Advancement of Science, and the American Academy of Arts and Sciences. She is a member of the National Academy of Engineering (1996), a foreign member of the Academia Europaea (2000), and a member of the Argentine National Academy of Physical Sciences (2003).

Awards
Kalnay has received several significant awards, including:
 American Geophysical Union's Roger Revelle Medal (2019)
 American Meteorological Society Eugenia Kalnay Symposium (2015)
 American Meteorological Society Honorary Member Award (2015)
 American Meteorological Society Joanne Simpson Mentorship Award (2015)
 Lorenz Lecturer (2012), a lecture named after Edward Lorenz and presented at the American Geophysical Union Fall Meeting
 54th International Meteorological Organization Prize (2009) from the World Meteorological Organization
 Doctor Honoris Causa, University of Buenos Aires (2008)
 First Eugenia Brin Professorship in Data Assimilation (2008)
 Distinguished University Professor, University of Maryland (2001)
 Bjerknes Lecturer (1999), an American Geophysical Union lecture named after Jacob Bjerknes
 American Meteorological Society Jule G. Charney Award (1995)
 National Aeronautics and Space Administration gold medal for Exceptional Scientific Achievement (1981)

References

External links 

 Academic Webpage

Living people
Women meteorologists
Argentine meteorologists
1942 births
Members of the United States National Academy of Engineering
Fellows of the American Geophysical Union
Argentine people of Hungarian descent
Members of Academia Europaea
University of Maryland, College Park faculty
Massachusetts Institute of Technology School of Science alumni
University of Buenos Aires alumni
Fellows of the American Academy of Arts and Sciences
Fellows of the American Association for the Advancement of Science
Fellows of the American Meteorological Society